The 2018 Big South women's basketball tournament was the postseason women's basketball tournament for the Big South Conference that took place March 8–11, 2018, at the Vines Center in Lynchburg, Virginia. The first round will be broadcast on the Big South Network and Roku, with all remaining games streamed on ESPN3. Liberty, the winner of the Big South tournament earns an automatic bid to the NCAA women's tournament.

Format
All ten teams were eligible for the tournament.  Seeding was determined based on regular season record and a tiebreaker system if necessary.  The top six teams received a bye into the second round while the bottom 4 teams played in the first round.  The top two teams played the two winners of the first round games.

Seeds

Schedule

*Game times in Eastern Time. #Rankings denote tournament seeding.

Bracket

See also
 2018 Big South Conference men's basketball tournament

References

Big South
Big South Conference women's basketball tournament